Agyneta birulaioides is a species of sheet weaver found in Ukraine, Kazakhstan, Russia and Mongolia. It was described by Wunderlich in 2005.

References

birulaioides
Arthropods of Mongolia
Spiders of Europe
Spiders of Asia
Spiders described in 2005